The Poverty Alleviating Party was a political party in the Maldives. It was registered with the Election Commission on 5 September 2008 and was dissolved in 2013.

References

Poverty Alleviating Party